Anastázie Fridrichová-Hajná (born 1 January 1946) is a Czechoslovak sprint canoer who competed for Czechoslovakia in the early to mid-1970s. Competing in two Summer Olympics, she earned her best finish of sixth in the K-1 500 m event at Montreal in 1976.

References

External links
 
 

1946 births
Canoeists at the 1972 Summer Olympics
Canoeists at the 1976 Summer Olympics
Czech female canoeists
Czechoslovak female canoeists
Living people
Olympic canoeists of Czechoslovakia